The 1962 All-Big Ten Conference football team consists of American football players chosen by various organizations for All-Big Ten Conference teams for the 1962 Big Ten Conference football season.

All-Big Ten selections

Quarterbacks
 Ron Vander Kelen, Wisconsin (AP-1; UPI-1)
 Tom Myers (AP-2; UPI-2)
 Duane Blaska, Minnesota (AP-3)
 Ron DiGravio, Purdue (UPI-3)

Halfbacks
 George Saimes, Michigan State (AP-1; UPI-1 [fullback])
 Paul Warfield, Ohio State (AP-1; UPI-1)
 Larry Ferguson, Iowa (AP-2; UPI-1)
 Sherman Lewis, Michigan State (AP-2)
 Paul Flatley, Northwestern (UPI-2)
 Lou Holland, Wisconsin (AP-3; UPI-3)
 Bill Munsey, Minnesota (AP-3; UPI-3)

Fullbacks
 Marv Woodson, Indiana (AP-2; UPI-2 [halfback])
 Roy Walker, Purdue (AP-2; UPI-2)
 Dave Francis, Ohio State (AP-3)
 Jerry Jones, Minnesota (UPI-3)

Ends
 Pat Richter, Wisconsin (AP-1; UPI-1)
 John Campbell, Minnesota (AP-1; UPI-1)
 Paul Flatley, Northwestern (AP-2)
 Bob Prawdzik, Minnesota (AP-2)
 Matt Snell, Ohio State (UPI-2)
 Matt Snorton, Michigan State (UPI-2)
 Ernie Clark, Michigan State (UPI-3)
 Thurman Walker, Illinois (UPI-3)
 Don Carlson, Wisconsin (AP-3)
 Forest Farmer, Purdue (AP-3)

Tackles
 Bobby Bell, Minnesota (AP-1; UPI-1)
 Don Brumm, Purdue (AP-1; UPI-1)
 Carl Eller, Minnesota (AP-2; UPI-2)
 Roger Pillath, Wisconsin (AP-2; UPI-3)
 Bob Vogel, Ohio State (AP-3; UPI-2)
 Ed Budde, Michigan State (AP-3 [guard]; UPI-3)
 Daryl Sanders, Ohio State (AP-3; UPI-3)

Guards
 Jack Cvercko, Northwestern (AP-1; UPI-1)
 Julian Hook, Minnesota (AP-1; UPI-1)
 Steve Underwood, Wisconsin (AP-2; UPI-3)
 Jim Schenk, Wisconsin (AP-2; UPI-3)
 Gary Moeller, Ohio State (UPI-2)
 Earl McQuiston, Iowa (UPI-2)
 Wally Hilgenberg, Iowa (AP-3)

Centers
 Dave Behrman, Michigan State (AP-1; UPI-3)
 Bill Armstrong, Ohio State (AP-2; UPI-1)
 Dick Butkus, Illinois (AP-3; UPI-2)

Key
AP = Associated Press

UPI = United Press International

Bold = Consensus first-team selection by both the AP and UPI

See also
1962 College Football All-America Team

References

All-Big Ten Conference
All-Big Ten Conference football teams